Ivan Lichter  (14 March 1918 – 12 June 2009) was a thoracic surgeon and a pioneer in the field of palliative care in New Zealand. He was appointed to the Order of New Zealand, the country's highest honour and limited to 20 living people, in the 1997 Queen's Birthday Honours.

Early life
Lichter was born in South Africa in 1918. He received his secondary education from Grey High School in Port Elizabeth, South Africa. He graduated from the University of the Witwatersrand in Johannesburg in 1940. He served with the South African Medical Corps during the second world war. After the war, he specialised in thoracic surgery and had his own medical practice.

In 1951, he married Heather Lloyd and they were to have four children, three of whom also went into the medical profession. He wanted to leave South Africa to get away from its politics, as the Afrikaans National Party started giving positions in hospitals to their supporters, and its antisemitism. He had the choice between a place in Texas and a place in New Zealand that he thought was called "Dune Din"; he settled on the latter and came to Dunedin with his family.

Life in New Zealand
He was an assistant lecturer at the University of Otago and at the same time was a surgeon for the Otago Hospital Board. From 1974, he was interested in palliative care. He retired from medical practice in 1984 and used the time to write Communication in Cancer Care, his most notable book.

He moved to Wellington in 1986 and took up a medical directorship at Te Omanga Hospice. He retained his directorship until 1993 and was an honorary consultant afterwards.

Among the organisation that he belonged to:
Advisory Board of Palliative Medicine
International Advisory Committee to the International Congress on the Care of the Terminally Ill
Founding executive member of the Australian and New Zealand Society of Palliative Medicine

Death
Ivan Lichter died in Auckland on 12 June 2009, at the age of 91. He was survived by his wife, their four children, and eight grandchildren.

References

1918 births
2009 deaths
Members of the Order of New Zealand
New Zealand thoracic surgeons
University of the Witwatersrand alumni
Academic staff of the University of Otago
South African emigrants to New Zealand
20th-century surgeons